The 1938 Western State Teachers Hilltoppers football team represented Western State Teachers College (later renamed Western Michigan University) as an independent during the 1938 college football season.  In their 10th season under head coach Mike Gary, the Broncos compiled a 4–3 record and outscored their opponents, 102 to 26.  Center Walter Oberlin and halfback Dale Morris were the team captains.

Schedule

References

Western State Teachers
Western Michigan Broncos football seasons
Western State Teachers Hilltoppers football